The 12th Genie Awards were held on November 26, 1991, and honoured Canadian films released in 1990 and 1991. The awards were moved from their previous March date after the disastrous ratings of the previous awards. The format was also changed and the eligible voters reduced to 130; in addition, because of the change of scheduling, the awards covered a longer eligibility period and a larger number of eligible films than any previous Genie Award ceremony.

The ceremony was hosted by Leslie Nielsen, and was held at the Pantages Theatre in Toronto. They were dominated by the Canadian/Australian co-production Black Robe, which was nominated for ten awards and won six.

Awards

References

External links 
Genie Awards 1991 on imdb

12
Genie
Genie
Genie